Bryan Jesús Figueroa De La Hoz (born 21 June 1999) is a Chilean footballer who plays for Audax Italiano.

References

1999 births
Living people
Chilean footballers
Chilean Primera División players
Audax Italiano footballers
Association football midfielders